The Lednice–Valtice Cultural Landscape (also Lednice–Valtice Area or Lednice–Valtice Complex) is a cultural-natural landscape complex of  in the South Moravian Region of the Czech Republic. It comprises the municipalities of Lednice, Valtice and Hlohovec, and the rural area of Břeclav.

In 1996, the Lednice-Valtice Area was registered on the UNESCO World Heritage List because of its unique mix of Baroque, Neolassical, and neo-Gothic architecture, and its history as a cultural landscape designed intentionally by a single family. It is adjacent to the Pálava Landscape Protected Area (Pálava Biosphere Reserve), a biosphere reserve registered by UNESCO several years before. The close proximity of two cultural landscapes protected by UNESCO is unique.

History
The House of Liechtenstein acquired a castle in Lednice in 1249, which marked the beginning of their settlement in the area. It remained the  principal Liechtenstein residence for 700 years, until 1939 and World War II.

17th–19th centuries
The Dukes of Liechtenstein transformed their properties into one large and designed private park between the 17th and 20th centuries. During the 19th century, the Dukes continued transforming the area as a large traditional English landscape park. The Baroque and neo-Gothic architecture of their chateaux are married with smaller buildings and a landscape that was fashioned according to the English principles of landscape architecture.

In 1715 these two chateaux (castles) were connected by a landscape allée and road, later renamed for the poet Petr Bezruč. The Lednice Ponds are situated between the town of Valtice and villages of Lednice and Hlohovec; as are the Mlýnský, Prostřední, Hlohovecký, and Nesyt Ponds. A substantial part of the cultural landscape complex is covered in pine forests, known as the "Pine−wood" (Boří les), and in areas adjacent to the Thaya River with riparian forests.

20th century
In 1918 the region became part of new Czechoslovakia. The Liechtenstein family opposed the annexation of Czech territory into Sudetenland by Nazi Germany, and as a consequence their properties were confiscated by the Nazis, and the family then relocated to Vaduz in 1939. After World War II the family made several legal attempts for restitution of the properties. Post-war, they had passed into ownership of Czechoslovakia: its Communist regime did not support returning large estates to exiled aristocratic landowners.

After the Czechoslovakian Velvet Revolution in 1989, the Liechtenstein descendants again renewed legal attempts for restitution, which were denied by the Czech state, the present day owner of the properties.

Features
The principal elements are:
 Chateau Valtice and its contiguous town of Valtice
 Lednice Castle and its contiguous village of Lednice
 The village of Hlohovec

Pavilions and follies

In addition to the castles, there are many large to small residential pavilions located throughout the designed landscape, often serving as chateau or hunting lodges.
 The Colonnade − Rajsna (German: Reistna)  — a Neoclassical colonnade on the top of a hill ridge above Valtice (like a gloriette) from the 1810s to 1820s
 Belvedere  — a belvedere landscape element.
 Rendezvous (or Temple of Diana)   — a hunting lodge in a form of a Neoclassical arch from the 1810s
 St Hubert Chapel (Kaple svatého Huberta)  — a Gothic Revival column structure from the 1850s dedicated to the patron saint of hunters, situated in the Pine wood
 Border House (Hraniční zámeček)  — a Classicist chateau built in the 1820s directly on the former (until 1920) borderline between Lower Austria and Moravia

 Temple of the Three Graces (Tři Grácie)  — a semicircle gallery with allegorical statues of Sciences and Muses and a statue of the Three Graces from the 1820s
 Pond House (Rybniční zámeček)  — at the shore of one of the Lednice Ponds

 Nový dvůr (German: Neuhof, New Farm)  — a Neoclassical farm finished in 1809, originally used for sheep husbandry, nowadays for horse breeding
 Apollo Temple (Apollónův chrám)  — a Neoclassical hunting lodge from the 1810s, ashore of one of the Lednice Ponds
 Hunting Lodge (Lovecký zámeček)  — a Neoclassical house from 1806
 John's Castle (Janův hrad or Janohrad)  — a Gothic Revival style folly of "artificial ruins" in style of a castle, finished in 1810
On clear days the Pálava Hills and Malé Karpaty Mountains can also be seen from the towers.
 Obelisk  — an obelisk erected in memory of the peace treaty of Campo Formio (1798)

 Pohansko  — an Empire-style hunting lodge finished after 1812, it houses an exhibition of Břeclav Town Museum: close to the lodge there are both an important archaeological site of Great Moravian remains and reconstructed parts of the Czechoslovak border fortifications
 Lány  — an Empire-style hunting lodge from the beginning of the 19th century

Preservation
The garden follies and the conservatory of Lednice Park were listed in the 1998 World Monuments Watch by the World Monuments Fund, for their deteriorating condition resulting from insufficient financial resources. The Fund had previously studied the preservation of Lednice and Valtice Castles, and after 1998 it helped fund restoration of the Valtice Rendezvous folly as a demonstration project with support from American Express.

See also
 
 List of World Heritage Sites in the Czech Republic

Gallery

References

Sources
 Kordiovský, Emil – Klanicová Evženie (eds.), Město Břeclav, Muzejní a vlastivědná společnost, Brno (2001).
 Památkový ústav v Brně: text on the reverse of a tourist map, Shocart, Zlín (1998).

External links

  UNESCO Czech heritage.org: Official Lednice-Valtice Cultural Landscape website
World Monuments Fund.org: Conservation & Economic Enhancement Plan for Valtice Zamek & its Environs, 1993.
 World Monuments Fund.org: Conservation & Economic Enhancement Plan for Lednice Zamek & its Environs, 1995.
 Lednicko-valticky-areal.cz" Lednice-Valtice Area—

Cultural landscapes
Buildings and structures in the South Moravian Region
Castles in the South Moravian Region
Continental gardens in the English Landscape Garden style
Folly buildings
Parks in the Czech Republic
Geography of the South Moravian Region
Tourist attractions in the South Moravian Region
World Heritage Sites in the Czech Republic